The U.S. state of Nevada first required its residents to register their motor vehicles in 1913. Registrants provided their own license plates for display until 1916, when the state began to issue plates.

, plates are issued by the Nevada Department of Motor Vehicles (DMV). Front and rear plates are required for most classes of vehicles, while only rear plates are required for motorcycles and trailers. Front plates are not required if the vehicle was not designed for a front plate and the manufacturer did not provide an add-on bracket or other means of mounting the front plate.

From 1928 to 2012, Nevada’s license plates were made at Nevada State Prison. The license plate factory moved to the Northern Nevada Correctional Center in 2012.

Passenger baseplates

1916 to 1960
The 1956 (expired June 30, 1957) issue was the first Nevada license plate that fully complied with these standards: the 1955 (expired June 30, 1956) issue was 6 inches in height by 12 inches in width, but had non-standard mounting holes.

No slogans were used on passenger plates during the period covered by this subsection.

1960 to present

County coding, 1954–81

Non-passenger plates

Optional types

Charitable & Collegiate plates

Classic Vehicle plates

Firefighter plates

Organization plates

Veterans plates

Discontinued non-passenger and optional plate types

References

External links
Nevada license plates, 1969–present

Nevada
Transportation in Nevada
1910 in transport
1910 introductions
Nevada transportation-related lists